This List of Soviet Air Force bases is a list containing all air bases within the Soviet Union or utilized by the Soviet Air Forces.  Additional information includes the location of the air base, which military units were in command of or hosted at the air base, and aircraft types known to have been based at the air base.  Dates shown indicate years during which units and aircraft were known to be at that airbase.  If none is indicated, the date is unknown.

In Russia the airbase naming convention seems to be to use the nearest village name, or in the case of a large city, use a numerical designator, i.e. Severomorsk-2. Quite often they are just referred to as, variously, "Tiksi aerodrome" and "Tiksi air base" (uncapitalized). This is also the convention that is used in declassified FOIA documents in the CIA archive website. Therefore, the construction 'X Air Base' or 'X Air Force Base' in regard to the USSR and Russian Federation appears to be incorrect.

Bases within the Soviet Union

Bases outside of the Soviet Union

Notes

References

 
Soviet
Air